The Favourite of the Queen (German: Der Favorit der Königin) is a 1922 German silent historical film directed by Franz Seitz and starring Erich Kaiser-Titz, Hanna Ralph and Willy Kaiser-Heyl. It is based on a play set in Elizabethan England.

The film was shot at the Emelka Studios in Munich. The film's sets were designed by the art director Willy Reiber.

Cast
 Erich Kaiser-Titz as Lord Surrey 
 Hanna Ralph as Königin Elisabeth 
 Willy Kaiser-Heyl as Pembroke 
 Maria Mindzenty as Evelyne 
 Oskar Marion as Comte Warwick 
 Alf Blütecher as Arthur Leyde 
 Otto Kronburger
 Carl Goetz
 Elise Aulinger
 Ferdinand Martini
 Albert Patry

References

Bibliography
Hans-Michael Bock and Tim Bergfelder. The Concise Cinegraph: An Encyclopedia of German Cinema. Berghahn Books, 2009.

External links

1922 films
Films of the Weimar Republic
Films directed by Franz Seitz
German silent feature films
1920s historical films
German historical films
German films based on plays
Films set in London
Films set in the 16th century
Films about Elizabeth I
Bavaria Film films
Films shot at Bavaria Studios
1920s German films